Milena Pergnerová (born July 29, 1975) is a Czech sprint canoer who competed in the mid-1990s. She was eliminated in the semifinals of the K-4 500 m event at the 1996 Summer Olympics in Atlanta.

References
Sports-Reference.com profile

1975 births
Canoeists at the 1996 Summer Olympics
Czech female canoeists
Living people
Olympic canoeists of the Czech Republic
Place of birth missing (living people)